The Quota Management System (QMS) is a type of individual fishing quota that is used in New Zealand to manage fish stocks.

New Zealand fishing industry
Seafood is one of New Zealand's largest export markets, with 85% of catches being exported. Over 90% of the total revenue raised by the country's fishing industry comes from exported stocks, raising NZ$3 billion annually. The most valuable species is the hoki, Macruronus novaezelandiae.

For the purposes of QMS, New Zealand's exclusive economic zone (EEZ) is divided into ten quota management regions. A separate quota is defined for each species in each region, depending on the species' distributions, ranging from a single fishing quota market for the hoki to eleven for the abalone Haliotis iris.

History
New Zealand is "the world leader in implementing IFQs". QMS was introduced by the Fisheries Amendment Act 1986, initially covering 26 marine species. The following year, it covered 30 species, and by 2005, it covered 93 species, out of the 140 commercial species in New Zealand's exclusive economic zone (EEZ). These comprised 550 separate fishing quota markets. QMS will eventually be extended to cover all living marine resources that are commercially exploited, including invertebrates, but excluding marine mammals.

Total allowable commercial catch

See also
Fishing industry in New Zealand
Environment of New Zealand

References

External links
Ministry of Fisheries – The Quota Management System

Fishing in New Zealand
Environmental policy in New Zealand
1986 in New Zealand
1986 in the environment
Fish conservation